The facial lymph nodes comprise three groups: 
 (a) infraorbital or maxillary, scattered over the infraorbital region from the groove between the nose and cheek to the zygomatic arch;
 (b) buccinator, one or more placed on the buccinator muscle opposite the angle of the mouth;
 (c) supramandibular, on the outer surface of the mandible, in front of the masseter and in contact with the external maxillary artery and anterior facial vein.

Their afferent vessels drain the eyelids, the conjunctiva, and the skin and mucous membrane of the nose and cheek; their efferents pass to the submandibular glands.

References

Lymphatics of the head and neck